Tou Xiong (born 1989/1990) is an American politician and member of the Minnesota House of Representatives. A member of the Minnesota Democratic–Farmer–Labor Party (DFL), he represents District 53A in the eastern Twin Cities metropolitan area.

Early life, education, and career
Xiong is the second child of eight siblings, born to refugees from Laos. He graduated from Tartan High School. He attended St. Cloud State University, graduating with a Bachelor of Arts in economics, and William Mitchell College of Law, graduating with a Juris Doctor.

Xiong was an urban planning organizer for the Harrison Neighborhood Association, a legislative clerk for the Minnesota Housing Finance Agency, worked for the Minnesota Legal Aid, the Public Health Law Center, a trustee on the Ramsey County Library board of directors, and a member of the Senate DFL District 53 executive committee. He was elected a member of the Maplewood city council in 2014.

Minnesota House of Representatives
Xiong was first elected to the Minnesota House of Representatives in 2018.

Personal life
Xiong resides in Maplewood, Minnesota.

References

External links

 Official House of Representatives website
 Official campaign website

Living people
Democratic Party members of the Minnesota House of Representatives
21st-century American politicians
Year of birth uncertain
Laotian emigrants to the United States
American politicians of Hmong descent
Asian-American people in Minnesota politics
Minnesota city council members
Asian-American city council members
Year of birth missing (living people)